Djibouti National Park is a national park in the Goda Mountains of Djibouti.

Among others, one of the attractions in this park includes several species of exotic plants such as Euphorbia, Ficus and Ziziphus.

References

National parks of Djibouti